Hsiao-ting Lin (born 1971) is a Taiwanese research fellow at the Hoover Institution who studies Greater China, including ethnopolitics, the Kuomintang, and Taiwan–United States relations during the Cold War.

Lin was born in Taipei in 1971. He received a bachelor's degree in political science from National Taiwan University in 1994 and a master's degree in international law and diplomacy from National Chengchi University in 1997. He holds a DPhil in oriental studies from the University of Oxford, which he received in 2003.

The 2017 Kingstone Award for Most Influential Book of the Year in Taiwan was awarded for his book "Accidental State: Chiang Kai-shek, the United States, and the Making of Taiwan" (Harvard University Press, 2016).

In April 2008, Lin was elected a Fellow of the Royal Asiatic Society of Great Britain and Ireland.

Books
Lin, Hsiao-ting. Tibet and Nationalist China's Frontier Intrigues and Ethnopolitics, 1928-49.  .Vancouver UBC Press, 2014. ISBN 9780774855280  WorldCat shows 644 copies.
Lin, Hsiao-ting. Modern China's Ethnic Frontiers: A Journey to the West. Routledge, 2013. ISBN   9780415855402 WorldCat  shows 856 copies
Lin, Hsiao-ting. Accidental State: Chiang Kai-Shek, the United States, and the Making of Taiwan.  Harvard University Press,  2016. ISBN 9780674659810  WorldCat shows 760 copies.
Also published in Chinese: 意外的國度 : 蔣介石, 美國, 與近代台灣的形塑 = Accidental state : Chiang Kai-shek, the United States, and the making of Taiwan /
Yi wai de guo du : Jiang Jieshi, Meiguo, yu jin dai Taiwan de xing su. by 林孝庭, transl. Zhongxian Huang ISBN 9789869442534 
Lin, Hsiao-ting. Tai hai leng zhan jie mi dang an = The cold war between Taiwan and China : the declassified documents.   2015. . ISBN 989013430

References 

1971 births
Living people
Historians of Taiwan
21st-century Taiwanese historians
Taiwanese political scientists
National Taiwan University alumni
National Chengchi University alumni
Hoover Institution people
Taiwanese expatriates in the United States
Taiwanese expatriates in the United Kingdom
Alumni of the University of Oxford
21st-century male writers
Writers from Taipei
Taiwanese male writers
Fellows of the Royal Asiatic Society